Iyad Abu Gharqoud (born 22 July 1988 in Gaza) is a Palestinian professional footballer who plays as a striker for Al-Baqa'a in the Jordan Premier League and Palestine national team.

Career
He was the league's joint-top leading scorer in 2010–11 season with Shabab Al-Am'ari scoring an impressive 20 goals in 22 league games.

He received his first national team cap against Afghanistan on 3 July 2011.

International goals

References

External links

Iyad Abu Gharqoud FIFA Should Give Israel the Red Card NYTimes.com

1988 births
Living people
Palestinian footballers
Markaz Shabab Al-Am'ari players
Shabab Al-Khalil SC players
Hilal Al-Quds Club players
Taraji Wadi Al-Nes players
Markaz Balata players
Shabab Alsamu players
Shabab Al-Dhahiriya SC players
Ahli Al-Khaleel players
Palestine international footballers
Expatriate footballers in Jordan
Palestinian expatriate sportspeople in Jordan
West Bank Premier League players
Association football forwards
Palestinian expatriate footballers
People from Gaza City